The 1992 Baltic Cup football competition was 12th season of the Baltic Cup and took place from 10–12 July 1992 at the Daugava Stadium in Liepāja, Latvia. It was the second annual competition of the three Baltic states – Latvia, Lithuania and Estonia – since they regained their independence from the Soviet Union in 1991. This time, FIFA did recognize the games as full internationals.

Results

Latvia vs Estonia

Lithuania vs Estonia

Latvia vs Lithuania

Final table

Winners

Scorers
3 goal
  Virginijus Baltušnikas
2 goal
  Ainars Linards
  Indro Olumets
1 goal
  Vitalijs Teplovs
  Jurijs Popkovs
  Vaidotas Slekys

References
RSSSF
RSSSF details
Omnitel

1992
Baltic Cup
Baltic Cup
Baltic Cup
1992